Indivisible was a  80-gun ship of the line of the French Navy.

Career 
Originally named the Indivisible in 1793, she was commissioned in Toulon on 23 September 1800. On 18 March 1800, Captain Louis-Marie Le Gouardun took command, which he retained until 9 March 1801.

On 5 February 1803, she was renamed Alexandre, and recommissioned in Brest under Captain Leveyer.

In December, under Captain Garreau, she was part of Corentin Urbain Leissègues's squadron bound for San Domingo.

From 1808, the Royal Navy used her as a gunpowder hulk in Plymouth. Indivisible was eventually broken up in 1822.

Notes and references

References

Bibliography
 
 
 

 

Ships of the line of the French Navy
Tonnant-class ships of the line
Ships built in France
1799 ships